Awesome is a 2001 album by the Tempations. Despite many changes in personnel, the album became the 45th to reach the Billboard 200, the first being Meet the Temptations in 1964. The lone single "4 Days" peaked at #19 on the Urban Adult Contemporary Charts.

It is the last album to featured 
Barrington “Bo” Henderson and 
Harry McGilberry before they were fired from the group in 2003.

Reception

According to Jason Birchmeier of AllMusic, Awesome contains "mostly ballads here and some innocent concessions to the hip-hop audience." The sound is similar to the group's surprisingly successful predecessor, Ear-Resistible, although "less rewarding", but it is still "the Temptations sounding like the Temptations."

Track listing
"Awesome Intro" (Narada Michael Walden, Otis Williams, Sunny Hilden) – 0:58
"Hurt So Bad" (Andy Cramer, Mechalie Jamison, Jerry Tawney) – 3:56
"4 Days" (Jasher) – 4:07
"Lady" (Sandra St. Victor, Tom Hammer) – 4:49
"Forget About It" (Christopher Grant, Jasher) – 4:23
"Awesome" (Narada Michael Walden, Otis Williams, Sunny Hilden) – 3:39
"Race for Your Heart" (Dennis Nelson, Otis Williams, William Rivera) – 4:22
"Swept Away" (Alonzo Jones, Jeff Porter, Narada Michael Walden, Robin Taylor Brooks) – 4:47
"My Baby" (Barrington Henderson, Carsten Lindberg, Joachim Svare) – 4:20
"Open Letter, My One Temptation Interlude" (Alonzo McKenzie, Ron Tyson) – 1:05
"So Easy" (Oji Pierce, Ron Tyson) – 5:44 
"A Love I Can See" (William Robinson) – 5:46. 
"That's How Heartaches Are Made" (Ben Raleigh, Bob Halley) – 4:46
"I Feel Good" (Stanley Brown) – 4:05

Personnel
The Temptations
Terry Weeks – tenor vocals
Barrington "Bo" Henderson – tenor vocals
Otis Williams – baritone  vocals
Ron Tyson – tenor/falsetto vocals
Harry McGilberry – bass vocals

Charts

References

2001 albums
The Temptations albums
Albums produced by Narada Michael Walden
Motown albums